Deileon ( Dēileōn) may refer to two figures in Greek mythology.  

 Deileon, a Triccan prince as son of King Deimachus in Thessaly. Along with his brothers, Autolycus and Phlogius, Deileon took part in the campaign of Hercules during the Amazon battles. These three brothers went astray and stayed at Sinope, where they later met the Argonauts and joined them on their expedition to Colchis. Plutarch mentioned him as Demoleon. 
 Deileon, a Greek henchman of Epeius of Phocis during the Trojan War. He was killed by the hero Aeneas.

Notes

References
Apollonius Rhodius, Argonautica translated by Robert Cooper Seaton (1853-1915), R. C. Loeb Classical Library Volume 001. London, William Heinemann Ltd, 1912. Online version at the Topos Text Project.
Apollonius Rhodius, Argonautica. George W. Mooney. London. Longmans, Green. 1912. Greek text available at the Perseus Digital Library.
Emmi Patsi-Garin The Abridged Dictionary of Greek Mythology (Επίτομο λεξικό Ελληνικής Μυθολογίας), Haris Patsis publishers, Athens 1969
Quintus Smyrnaeus, The Fall of Troy translated by Way. A. S. Loeb Classical Library Volume 19. London: William Heinemann, 1913. Online version at theio.com
Quintus Smyrnaeus, The Fall of Troy. Arthur S. Way. London: William Heinemann; New York: G.P. Putnam's Sons. 1913. Greek text available at the Perseus Digital Library.

Achaeans (Homer)
Thessalian mythology